Cuttyhunk Light was a lighthouse at the west end of Cuttyhunk Island, Massachusetts.
First established in 1823, it was rebuilt several times.  The last lighthouse was built in 1891, with a 5th order Fresnel Lens in a  tower.  This was heavily damaged in the Great Atlantic Hurricane of 1944 and was torn down in 1947 and replaced by a skeleton tower.  The keeper's house was also destroyed. The skeleton tower was discontinued in 2005. Only a stone oil house remains from the lighthouse station, missing its door and roof.

References

Further reading
 Terpeny, Eugene - Family History
 Terpeny, Alice - Interview

Lighthouses completed in 1823
Lighthouses completed in 1891
Buildings and structures demolished in 1947
Lighthouses in Dukes County, Massachusetts
1823 establishments in the United States